Manas Mukherjee (also known as Manas Mukharji; 9 September 1943 — 16 October 1986) was an Indian composer who composed several albums in Hindi. He was the son of Jahar Mukherjee, a Thumri singer, composer, lyricist and a film producer based in Kolkata, West Bengal. Mukherjee was also the father of two well known Indian singers, Shaan and Sagarika. He died on 16th October 1986.

Filmography (Hindi films)
 Teesra Patthar
 Shaayad - 1979
 Labbaik - 1980
 Albert Pinto Ko Gussa Kyon Aata Hai - 1981
 Guru Suleman Chela Pahelwan - 1981
 Lubna - 1982
 Aao Pyaar Karen - 1983
 Dilawar - 1984
 Lakhon Ki Baat - 1984
 Mahananda - 1984
 Banda Nawaz - 1989

Composed Songs
Saiyan Bane Hai Thanedar [Teesra Patthar]

References

1943 births
1986 deaths
20th-century Indian male singers
20th-century Indian singers
Bengali singers